Diplolepis is a genus of approximately fifty species in the gall wasp family Cynipidae. The larvae induce galls on wild roses (Rosa), and rarely on domestic roses.

Description 
Adults are small with a strongly arched mesosoma giving them a hunched appearance. Coloration ranges from entirely orange to reddish-brown or black. Larvae are legless and cream-colored with a weakly defined head.

Galls formed by a given species can usually be distinguished from those of other species by the shape, size, placement, and ornamentation (smooth or spiny) of the gall, together with the identity of the host plant. However, gall morphology can be modified by the presence of inquilines and parasitoids. Some species induce galls on leaves, while others induce galls on stems or adventitious shoots. Depending on the species of wasp, galls may be single-chambered or multi-chambered, and detachable or integral.

Range 
Diplolepis species occur throughout the holarctic region. While most described species are in the nearctic, it is likely many species remain to be discovered and described, particularly in the eastern palearctic.

Life cycle 
All Diplolepis species lay eggs and induce galls only on rose (Rosa) species, and are thus dependent on roses to complete their life cycle. There is only one generation per year. Adult emergence from galls coincides with the availability of suitable host plant tissue required for oviposition and gall formation; this can be in spring or later in summer depending on the species. The adult life span is 5–12 days, during which they mate and the females lay their eggs. Eggs are attached to 1-2 plant cells and gall formation begins before the eggs hatch. Larvae are entirely surrounded by their galls shortly after they begin feeding. Larvae remain in their galls during the summer while feeding on gall tissue, and mature by late summer. They overwinter in their galls as pre-pupae; they complete pupation in spring and the adults chew their way out of the galls.

Inquilines and parasitoids 
The galls of nearly all Diplolepis species are known to host inquilines - species that invade and occupy a gall but do not feed on the larva of the inducing species, though the inducing larva often dies as a result of the activity of the inquiline. Species of the gall wasp genus Periclistus are the most common inquiline species found in Diplolepis galls and may occupy over half the Diplolepis galls produced in a given year.

The larvae of both the gall-inducing Diplolepis species and the inquilines (if present) are used as hosts by a number of parasitoid wasps, including wasps from the families Eulophidae, Eurytomidae, Chalcididae, Pteromalidae, Torymidae, and Ichneumonidae.

Taxonomy 
The name 'Diplolepis' was first used for this group by Etienne-Louis Geoffroy in 1762. The genus is monophyletic and, with Liebelia, constitutes the tribe Diplolepidini within the subfamily Cyinipinae. There are currently about 50 described species in the genus, including:

 Diplolepis abei
Diplolepis arefacta
Diplolepis ashmeadi
Diplolepis bassetti
 Diplolepis bicolor
 Diplolepis californica
Diplolepis dichlocera
 Diplolepis eglanteriae
Diplolepis flaviabdomenis
 Diplolepis fructuum
Diplolepis fulgens
 Diplolepis fusiformans
 Diplolepis gracilis
Diplolepis hunanensis
 Diplolepis ignota
Diplolepis inconspicuis
 Diplolepis japonica
Diplolepis lens
 Diplolepis mayri
Diplolepis minoriabdomenis
 Diplolepis nebulosa
Diplolepis neglecta
 Diplolepis nervosa
Diplolepis nigriceps
Diplolepis nitida
 Diplolepis nodulosa
 Diplolepis oregonensis
Diplolepis ostensackeni
 Diplolepis polita
Diplolepis pustulatoides
 Diplolepis radicum
Diplolepis radoszkowskii
 Diplolepis rosae
 Diplolepis rosaefolii
Diplolepis similis
 Diplolepis spinosa
 Diplolepis spinosissimae
Diplolepis terrigena
 Diplolepis triforma
Diplolepis tuberculatrix
Diplolepis tumida
Diplolepis valtonyci
 Diplolepis variabilis
Diplolepis variegata
Diplolepis verna
Diplolepis weldi

References

Cynipidae
Hymenoptera genera
Taxa named by Étienne Louis Geoffroy